Hercules in the Underworld is the fourth television movie in the syndicated fantasy series Hercules: The Legendary Journeys.

In the film, Hercules is finally a happy family man with his wife Deianeira, two young sons Aeson and Clonus, daughter Ilea and in-living centaur Nessus. When villagers begin disappearing it is discovered that they had fallen through a crack in the earth which goes straight to Hades. Hercules once again comes to the rescue and faces one of his most difficult challenges, and must prove himself as a man as well as a god.

Plot
In the center of a village, the ground begins to open up and a strange green light emanates from within. Two drunken men see the light and walk over to take a closer look. As they approach, a gaseous vapour begins pouring out of the fissure and in a flash of light the two men are charred with only their bones remaining. Then a desirable young woman is being bathed and dressed afterwards. Meanwhile in a village square, a man challenges the villagers to fight Eryx the boxer. One man agrees but he is tricked when he is introduced to the real boxer, a towering brute of a man. The challenger dies fighting Eryx, so an old man from the village tells a youth to find Hercules. After a short while, the boy returns with Hercules, who challenges Eryx. They begin to fight and it appears that Eryx is going to beat Hercules, but then Hercules finally ends the fight by killing Eryx. With the man dead, the man who first made the challenge gives Hercules a peacock feather, Hera's symbol. He goes to Hera's temple and asks if they can call a truce; Hera defies Hercules, so he destroys her temple. Zeus appears and tells Hercules that he will only make things worse between him and Hera. When Hercules arrives home, Deianeira tends to his wounds and they make love.

The following day, Hercules is working in the smithy with Nessus, the centaur. He watches his children playing outside when a woman, Iole, comes looking for him and faints. She says she is from the village of Gryphon and that they need Hercules' help. Hercules agrees to help, but Deianeira tells the girl to rest first. During the night, Iole tells Deianeira that she thought she saw something outside her window. Deianeria tells her nothing or nobody is there. Deianeira gets a lantern and goes outside; she finds Nessus in the smithy and he tells her that she cannot trust Hercules with Iole as she is a virgin young woman, Hercules will not be able to resist. She defends him saying that Hercules would be faithful to her but she starts to doubt when sees the virgin maiden sleeping naked. In the morning Hercules, Iole and Nessus leave for Gryphon. Before leaving Iole gives Deianeira a necklace to thank her for looking after her the night before. Deianeira goes to the market where a woman tells her that the necklace is a sign that she has lost her husband and tells Deianeira about the necklace is given to women whose men are to be killed by Nurian maidens trained so well in the art of seduction that they can get any man in their power. Deianeira goes after Hercules to warn him and finds the three at a river bank. She tells Iole to leave, but Hercules says he already knew she was a Nurian maiden, but that he loves Deianeira, and would never be unfaithful to her. After reassuring Deianeira, Hercules and Iole continue to Gryphon with Hercules holding Iole in his arms to help her cross the river, but Nessus begins to stir doubts in Deianeira's mind, and after she tries to get away he attacks her. Nessus tries to rape her. She calls for Hercules, who shoots an arrow which strikes Nessus in the back. As he lay dying, Nessus showing Deianeira the cloak his blood drenches tells her that his blood is powerful and will prevent Hercules from being unfaithful. She gives the cape to Hercules and tells him to wear it if he gets cold.

Hercules and Iole continue their journey, discussing their past and popularly exaggerated reputations. Iole demonstrates how her power can work for good, stopping an apparently raging man from causing a major fight by touching him and diagnosing he just burnt his mouth on hot soup. They come close to each other in a night and she kisses him. The other day, she swims naked in a lake while a man, who she mistakes for Hercules, watches her. She then stops Hercules from killing the young Lycastus from her village, a love interest of her who attacks anyone he considers a rival for the heart of Iole. When they arrive at the village, the hell-mouth is stronger than ever. Lycastus and Iole passionately kiss each other as she is being prepared for Hercules. He begs her but she says that Hercules is her destiny. Hercules walks through the village seeing fire and destructions and dead bodies strewn on the floor. He approaches the fissure and looks into it and sees spirits coming out from deep within the Earth. Zeus appears and tells him that it is the Underworld. Hercules asks if he is mortal or not, Zeus tells him he is mortal, but tries to prevent Hercules from going down the hole. The half-god hesitates to believe his father Zeus, who answers reluctantly he can die, yet turns Iole's desperate plea - taking off her clothes, offering herself and kissing him - down and gives her to Lycastus but when the cloak drenched in Nessus' blood nearly kills him as he puts it on setting out to return home and displays Hera's peacock-sign, he jumps into the Underworld. As Hercules travels to the Underworld, a man arrives at Hercules' house and tells Deianeira that Hercules is dead. He explains about the cape trying to kill Hercules and that he jumped into the hole. Hercules arrives in the Underworld, where he meets Charon, whom he forces to transport him across the River Styx. On the other side of the river Hercules finds Cerberus' collar, he enters a doorway and vanishes.

Meanwhile, Deianeira, distraught by the thought that she caused her own husband's death, goes to a cliff top; while standing there she sees a vision of Hercules and reaches out to him; as she reaches out she falls from the cliff to the rocks below and two eyes appear in the sky. After being attacked by different monsters, Hercules meets Eryx the boxer and some other people he sent to Hades and cleverly makes them fight each other and then sees Nessus, who taunts him by showing him, via a portal, that Deianeira is dead. Hercules ask for Nessus to show him again, when Nessus shows Deianeira again Hercules jumps through the portal into the Elysian fields. He finds Deianeira but she has no memory of him, Hades appears and tells Hercules that he erased her memory about Hercules because of the thought of killing her husband. He begs Deianeria to remember him and their children and then kisses her. With the kiss her memories return and Hercules makes a deal with Hades that if he can capture Cerberus, who got loose and causes havoc all through the Underworld, then Deianeira can go back to Earth with him. Hercules goes after Cerberus, he finds Hades' men trying and failing to capture him. The hunt is arduous, but his physical force and kindness at the right time do the job. Once Cerberus is chained the hole in the ground closes up and Deianeira appears. Back on Earth, the villagers thank Hercules for helping them and he and Deianeira go home. Iole says goodbye to him with a sweet kiss as Deianeira smiles.

Cast
 Kevin Sorbo as Hercules
 Anthony Quinn as Zeus
 Tawny Kitaen as Deianeira
 Marley Shelton as Iole
 Cliff Curtis as Nessus
 Jorge González as Eryx the Boxer
 John McKee as Fake Eryx the Boxer
 Tim Balme as Lycastus
 Michael Hurst as Aelus/Charon
 Mark Ferguson as Hades
 Rose McIver as Ilea
 Paul McIver as Aeson
 Simon Lewthwaite as Klonus
 Rose Glucina as Althea

External links
 

Hercules: The Legendary Journeys
Films set in ancient Greece
New Zealand television films
Films about Heracles
Films directed by Bill L. Norton